Utsav Charan Das is an Indian dancer. He is also a lyricist, music composer and play writer. In 2020, he was awarded Padma Shri by the Indian government for his contribution in Arts.

Early life and education
Das is from Chaudwar in Odisha. He is a matriculate.

Career
Das worked as a stenographer in the state government. In 1960, he performed Ghoda Nacha for the first time with his father. He has written many lyrical plays namely Bhai Juntia, Krushna Avatar, Mahisa Nasini, Gambhiribije, Khaiunjula, Kelikadamb, Rangakeli and Gujuna. He has written many songs on health problems and social initiatives like AIDS, malaria, leprosy prevention, Swachh Bharat, Beti Bachao Beti Padhao.

Awards
 Padma Shri
 Odisha Sangeet Natak Akademi Award

References

Recipients of the Padma Shri in arts
Indian male dancers
Dancers from Odisha
Year of birth missing (living people)
Living people